was a town located in Higashiazai District, Shiga Prefecture, Japan. It is on the northern shore of Lake Biwa and that was the origin of the town's name. Chikubu Island was under the administration of Biwa.

As of 2003, the town had an estimated population of 7,599 and a population density of 447.53 persons per km2. The total area was 16.98 km2.

On February 13, 2006, Biwa, along with the town of Azai (also from Higashiazai District), was merged into the expanded city of Nagahama.

Biwa-cho is the home of the Tonda Traditional Bunraku Puppet Troupe, a troupe founded in the 1830s in the tradition of Bunraku puppetry. The Tonda Troupe has performed internationally four times in the United States and Australia.

Dissolved municipalities of Shiga Prefecture
Nagahama, Shiga